Viacheslav Dydyshko (born 10 April 1949) is a Belarusian chess player who received the FIDE title of Grandmaster (GM) in 1995.

He won eleven times the Belarusian Chess Championship (from 1965 to 2006) and played for Belarus in the Chess Olympiads of 1994, 1996, 1998, 2000, 2002, 2004 and 2006. He won twice Baltic Chess Championship (1973 and 1974), and Rubinstein Memorial at Polanica-Zdrój 1983.

Books
Viacheslav Dydyshko, Logic of modern chess, Minsk 1989

Notable games
Viacheslav Dydyshko vs Maia Chiburdanidze, URS-ch sf 1982, King's Indian Defense: Averbakh Variation, Flexible Defense (E73), 1-0
Valerij Smirnov vs Viacheslav Dydyshko, Minsk 1994, King's Indian Defense: Orthodox Variation, Modern System (E97), 0-1

References

External links
 
 
 
 

1949 births
Living people
Belarusian chess players
Soviet chess players
Chess grandmasters
Chess Olympiad competitors
Chess writers